Sultan Abu Al-Nasr Sayf ad-Din Al-Ashraf Qaitbay (c. 1416/14187 August 1496) was the eighteenth Burji Mamluk Sultan of Egypt from 872 to 901 A.H. (1468–1496 C.E.). (Other transliterations of his name include Qaytbay, Kait Bey, and Qayt Bay.) He was Circassian by birth, and was purchased by the ninth sultan Barsbay (1422 to 1438 C.E.) before being freed by the eleventh Sultan Jaqmaq (1438 to 1453 C.E.). During his reign, he stabilized the Mamluk state and economy, consolidated the northern boundaries of the Sultanate with the Ottoman Empire, engaged in trade with other contemporaneous polities, and emerged as a great patron of art and architecture. In fact, although Qaitbay fought sixteen military campaigns, he is best remembered for the spectacular building projects that he sponsored, leaving his mark as an architectural patron on Mecca, Medina, Jerusalem, Damascus, Aleppo, Alexandria, and every quarter of Cairo.

Biography

Early life
Qaitbay was born between 1416 and 1418 in Great Circassia of the Caucasus. His skill in archery and horsemanship attracted the attention of a slave merchant who purchased him and brought him to Cairo when he was already over twenty years of age. He was quickly purchased by the reigning sultan Barsbay and became a member of the palace guard. He was freed by Barsbay's successor, Jaqmaq, after learning that Qaitbay was a descendant of the Ayyubid Emir of Damascus Al-Ashraf Musa (d. 1237), and appointed the third executive secretary; under the reigns of Sayf ad-Din Inal, Khushqadam and Yilbay, he was further promoted through the Mamluk military hierarchy, eventually becoming taqaddimat alf, commander of a thousand Mamluks. Under the Sultan Timurbugha, finally, Qaitbay was appointed atabak, or field marshal of the entire Mamluk army. During this period, Qaitbay amassed a considerable personal fortune which would enable him to exercise substantial acts of beneficence as sultan without draining the royal treasury.

Accession

The reign of Timuburgha lasted less than two months, as he was dethroned in a palace coup on 30 January 1468. Qaitbay was proposed as a compromise candidate acceptable to the various court factions. Despite some apparent reluctance, he was enthroned on 31 January. Qaitbay insisted that Timurburgha be granted an honorable retirement, instead of the enforced exile usually imposed on dethroned sovereigns. He did, however, exile the leaders of the coup, and created a new ruling council composed of his own followers and more veteran courtiers who had fallen into disgrace under his predecessors. Yashbak min Mahdi was appointed dawadar, or executive secretary, and Azbak min Tutkh was named atabak; the two men would remain Qaitbay's closest advisors until the ends of their careers, despite their profound dislike for each other. In general Qaitbay seems to have pursued a policy of appointing rivals to posts of equal authority, thus preventing any single subordinate from acquiring too much power and maintaining the ability to settle all disputes via his own autocratic authority.

Early reign
Qaitbay's first major challenge was the insurrection of Shah Suwar, leader of a small Turkmen dynasty, the Dhu'l-Qadrids, in eastern Anatolia. A first expedition against the upstart was soundly defeated, and Suwar threatened to invade Syria. A second Mamluk army was sent in 1469 under the leadership of Azbak, but was likewise defeated. Not until 1471 did a third expedition, this time commanded by Yashbak, succeed in routing Suwar's army. In 1473, Suwar was captured and led back to Cairo, together with his brothers; the prisoners were drawn and quartered and their remains were hung from Bab Zuwayla.

Qaitbay's reign was also marked by trade with other contemporaneous polities. Excavations in the late 1800s and early 1900s at over fourteen sites in the vicinity of Borama in modern-day northwestern Somalia unearthed, among other things, coins identified as having been derived from Qaitbay. Most of these finds are associated with the medieval Sultanate of Adal, and were sent to the British Museum in London for preservation shortly after their discovery.

Consolidation of power
Following the defeat of Suwar, Qaitbay set about purging his court of the remaining factions and installing his own purchased Mamluks in all positions of power. He frequently went on excursions, ostentatiously leaving the Citadel with limited guards to display his trust of his subordinates and of the populace. He traveled throughout his reign, visiting Alexandria, Damascus, and Aleppo, among other cities, and personally inspecting his many building projects. In 1472 he performed the Hajj to Mecca. He was struck by the poverty of the citizens of Medina and devoted a substantial portion of his private fortune to the alleviation of their plight. Through such measures Qaitbay gained a reputation for piety, charity, and royal self-confidence.

Ottoman-Mamluk war

In 1480 Yashbak led an army against the Aq Qoyunlu dynasty in Northern Mesopotamia, but was soundly defeated while attacking Urfa, taken prisoner, and executed. These events foreshadowed a longer military engagement with the far more powerful Ottoman Empire in Anatolia. In 1485 Ottoman armies began to campaign on the Mamluk frontier, and an expedition was dispatched from Cairo to confront them. These Mamluk troops won a surprising victory in 1486 near Adana. A temporary truce ensued, but in 1487 the Ottomans reoccupied Adana, only to be defeated once more by a massive Mamluk army. As the concomitant Ottoman expansion in the western Mediterranean represented an increased threat to the Catholic Monarchs of Spain, Ferdinand II of Aragon made a temporary alliance with the Mamluks against the Ottomans from 1488 until 1491, shipping wheat and offering a fleet of 50 caravels against the Ottomans.

In 1491 a final truce was signed that would last through the remaining reigns of Qaitbay and the Ottoman Sultan Bayezid II. Qaitbay's ability to enforce a peace with the greatest military power in the Muslim world further enhanced his prestige at home and abroad.

Final years

The end of Qaitbay's reign was marred by increasing unrest among his troops and a decline in his personal health, including a riding accident that left him comatose for days. Many of his most trusted officials died, and were replaced by far less scrupulous upstarts; a long period of palace intrigue ensued. In 1492 the plague returned to Cairo, and was reported to have claimed 200,000 lives. Qaitbay's health became markedly poor in 1494, and his court, now lacking a figure of central authority, was wracked by infighting, factionalism, and purges.

He died on 8 August 1496 and was interred in the spectacular mausoleum attached to his mosque in Cairo's Northern Cemetery which he had built during his lifetime. He was succeeded by his son, an-Nasir Muhammad (not to be confused with the famed 14th-century sultan of the same name.)

Family
One of his wives was the daughter of Sultan Sayf ad-Din Inal. Another wife was Khawand Aslbay, a Circassian, and sister of Sultan Abu Sa'id Qansuh. She was the mother of his son, Sultan Sultan An-Nasir Muhammad. After Qaitbay's death, she married Sultan Al-Ashraf Janbalat. Another wife was Khawand Fatima, the daughter of Ala al-Din Ali bin Ali bin Al-Khassbak. After Qaitbay's death, she married Sultans Tuman bay I and Al-Ashraf Qansuh al-Ghuri. She died on 6 June 1504. Another wife was Khawand Zaynab. Al-Ashraf Sayf ad-Din Qaitbay fathered three sons. He was succeeded by his eldest son, Sultan An-Nasir Muhammad, who was born in 1482. His second son, Al-Aziz Muhammad was born in 1484, and his third son As-Salih Muhammad, born in 1487, would later become a muqaddim a commander in the army of Sultan Qanush al-Ghawri. His only daughter was Sitti Chirakasa.

Legacy

Qaitbay's reign has traditionally been seen as the "happy culmination" of the Burji Mamluk dynasty. It was a period of unparalleled political stability, military success, and prosperity, and Qaitbay's contemporaries admired him as a defender of traditional Mamluk values. At the same time, he may be criticized for his conservatism, and for his failure to innovate in the face of new challenges. Following Qaitbay's death, the Mamluk state descended into a prolonged succession crisis lasting for five years until the accession of Al-Ashraf Qansuh al-Ghawri.

Architectural patronage 
Today Qaitbay is perhaps best known for his wide-ranging architectural patronage, which was second only to al-Nasir Muhammad ibn Qalawun. At least 230 monuments, either surviving or mentioned in contemporary sources, are associated with his reign. In Egypt, Qaitbay's buildings are found throughout Cairo, as well as in Alexandria and Rosetta; in Syria he sponsored projects in Aleppo and Damascus; in addition, he was responsible for the construction of madrasas and fountains in Jerusalem and Gaza, which still stand – most notably the Fountain (sabil) of Qayt Bay and al-Ashrafiyya Madrasa. On the Arabian peninsula, Qaitbay sponsored the restoration of mosques and the construction of madrasas, fountains and hostels in Mecca and Medina. After a serious fire struck the Mosque of the Prophet in Medina in 1481, the building, including the Tomb of the Prophet, was extensively renewed through Qaitbay's patronage.

One of Qaytbay's largest building projects in Cairo was his funerary complex in the Northern Cemetery, which included his mausoleum, a mosque/madrasa, a maq'ad (reception hall), and various auxiliary structures and functions attached to it. It is considered a masterpiece of late Mamluk architecture and is featured today on Egypt's 1 pound note. His other contributions in Cairo include a Wikala at Bab al-Nasr, a Wikala-Sabil-Kuttab near al-Azhar Mosque, a Sabil-Kuttab on Saliba street, a madrasa-mosque at Qal'at al-Kabsh, a mosque on Rhoda Island, and a palace that is now incorporated into the Bayt Al-Razzaz palace. Other amirs and patrons also built notable projects under his reign, such as the Mosque of Amir Qijmas al-Ishaqi, which feature the same refined architectural style of his time. In Alexandria he notably built a fortress on the site of the ruined Pharos, now known as the Citadel (or Fort) of Qaitbay.

References

Sources
 Stefano Carboni, Venice and the Islamic World, 828–1797 (New Haven, 2007).
 J.-C. Garcin, "The regime of the Circassian Mamluks," in C.F. Petry, ed., The Cambridge History of Egypt I: Islamic Egypt, 640–1517 (Cambridge, 1998), 290–317.
 
 A. W. Newhall, The patronage of the Mamluk Sultan Qā’it Bay, 872–901/1468–1496 (Diss. Harvard, 1987).
 C.F. Petry, Twilight of majesty: the reigns of the Mamlūk Sultans al-Ashrāf Qāytbāy and Qānṣūh al-Ghawrī in Egypt (Seattle, 1993).

Qaitbay